Tosontsengel may refer to:

several Sums (districts) in different Aimags (provinces) in Mongolia
 Tosontsengel, Khövsgöl, a sum in Khövsgöl aimag 
 Tosontsengel, Zavkhan, a sum in Zavkhan aimag